The Stock Exchange of Visions is a project initiated in 2006 by Fabrica, Benetton's research center. It gathers visionaries from diverse nationalities and cultures, who hail from a wide range of specialties, to provide insight into their vision for the future.

Artists, sociologists, activists, scientists and others have answered a questionnaire designed to explore their idea of the future regarding our culture, environment, resources, economy and society. Stock Exchange of Visions aims to contribute to the awareness of our relationship with the planet while supplying positive and thoughtful answers regarding major global issues.

Stock Exchange of Visions consists of an interactive installation and website which allows the participant to access the growing content of the project and interact with it. The installation is a site-specific knowledge hub while the website provides global access to the visions of the future collected by the project.

Installation 
The Stock Exchange of Visions installation creates an on-site, interactive knowledge experience. The installation features a revolutionary interactive menu to access the visions of the future, which are projected onto a life-size video screen. The life-size video screen aims to create a dialogue sphere between the selected visionary and the installation participant.

The Stock Exchange of Visions installation is a traveling installation, which has been presented at the main cultural outlets of Europe. The installation was first seen at the Centre Georges Pompidou in Paris (2006), the second presentation will be the Trienale of Milan (2007). The objective of this traveling installation is to allow visitors to have an interactive physical experience with the visions of the future, while the website provides constant global access to the content of the project.

Visionaries
Stock Exchange of Visions has collected the video interviews of the following Visionaries:

 Abdourahman Waberi
 Grethel Aguilar
 Alberto Alesina
 Angel Almendros
 Pilar Andres
 Nima Arkani-Hamed
 Francisco Arredondo
 Mario Botta
 Jared Breiterman
 Alan Burdick
 Ernesto Cardenal
 Azurra Carpo
 Peter Cavanagh
 Alan Cooper
 Herman Daly
 Norihiko Dan
 Emilio Del Giucide
 Bita Fayyazi
 Amy Franceschini
 Luis Enrique Godoy
 Al Gore
 Sven Erik Jorgensen
 Julie Lasky
 Ervin László
 Joep van Lieshout
Ezio Manzini
 Eva Mattes
 Franco Mattes
 Bruce Mau
 Gianantonio Melli
 Eduardo Moron
 Felix Müller
 Youssou N'Dour
 Wallace J. Nochols
 Piergiorgio Odifreddi
 Sergio Ramírez
 Ignacio Ramonet
 Godfrey Reggio
 Wolfgang Sachs
 Vandana Shiva
 Richard Slaughter
 Enzo Tiezzi
 Tathagat Avatar Tulsi
 Robert Ulanowicz
 Salvatore Veca
 Massimo Vignelli
 Jin Xing

External links
 Stock Exchange of Visions website
 Stock Exchange of Visions: Forum. Share your visions of the future.

Internet forums
Online databases
Video